Pool B (Dushanbe) of the 2022 Billie Jean King Cup Asia/Oceania Zone Group II was one of four pools in the Asia/Oceania zone of the 2022 Billie Jean King Cup. Four teams competed in a round robin competition, with each team proceeding to their respective sections of the play-offs: the top team played for advancement to Group I in 2023.

Standings 

Standings are determined by: 1. number of wins; 2. number of matches; 3. in two-team ties, head-to-head records; 4. in three-team ties, (a) percentage of matches won (head-to-head records if two teams remain tied), then (b) percentage of sets won (head-to-head records if two teams remain tied), then (c) percentage of games won (head-to-head records if two teams remain tied), then (d) Billie Jean King Cup rankings.

Round-robin

Pakistan vs. Mongolia

Turkmenistan vs. Tajikistan

Pakistan vs. Tajikistan

Turkmenistan vs. Mongolia

Mongolia vs. Tajikistan

Pakistan vs. Turkmenistan

References

External links 
 Billie Jean King Cup website

2022 Billie Jean King Cup Asia/Oceania Zone